Sphaerocera is a genus of flies belonging to the family of the lesser dung flies.

Species
S. curvipes Latreille, 1805
S. elephantis Hayashi, 1990
S. flaviceps Malloch, 1925
S. monilis Haliday, 1836
S. pseudomonilis Nishijima & Yamazaki, 1984
S. tuberculosa Kim, 1968

References

Sphaeroceridae
Muscomorph flies of Europe
Diptera of North America
Diptera of Asia
Sphaeroceroidea genera